The North American Agreement on Environmental Cooperation (NAAEC) is an environmental agreement between the United States of America, Canada and Mexico as a side-treaty of the North American Free Trade Agreement. The agreement came into effect January 1, 1994.

The agreement consists of a declaration of principles and objectives concerning conservation and the protection of the environment as well as concrete measures to further cooperation on these matters between the three countries. Part Three of the NAAEC establishes the Commission for Environmental Cooperation (CEC), which was set up as part of the agreement. The structure of the CEC is composed of the Council, which is the governing body, a Secretariat based in Montreal and the Joint Public Advisory Committee.

References

Trilateral relations of Canada, Mexico, and the United States
Environment of North America
Environmental treaties
Treaties entered into force in 1994
1994 in the environment
Treaties concluded in 1993
North American Free Trade Agreement